The Bologna-Raticosa Hill Climb, one of the most challenging hill climbs in Italy and Europe, is the longest-running uphill automobile race in the world. The event is reserved for categories Turismo, Gran Turismo, Sport and Sport Prototypes. 

It took place from 1950 to 1954 starting from Bologna, via Toscana, near the bridge of St. Ruffillo and measuring 43.20 kilometers. Subsequently, from 1962 to 1969, the route was reduced to 32.72 kilometers and the starting point was marked in front of the Albergo Posta of Pianoro Vecchio. 

2006 was the 50th anniversary of the first Hillclimb. Three runs were held in 1956/7/8 and three more in 2004/5/6. June 22, 1969 was the last time the race was held.

Since 2001 classic cars race on a reduced track Pianoro Vecchio-Livergnano of 6 km.

Bologna-Raticosa Hill Climb winners

Classic Car winners

References

External links 
 

Hillclimbs
Auto races in Italy
Motorsport venues in Italy